Anthony Lawrence Carey (born October 16, 1953, Watsonville, California) is an American-born, European-based musician, composer, producer, and singer/songwriter. One of his earliest musical experiences was as a keyboardist for Rainbow. After his departure in 1977, he began a solo career, releasing albums under his own name as well under the pseudonym Planet P Project, and producing for and performing with other artists.

Early history
Carey had been playing his church's piano during off hours since he was very young, and he was permitted to play the pipe organ as well. He was fascinated by the sound. His family acquired a piano when he was seven, and he "lived at that piano" until, at age eleven, he got his first acoustic guitar and formed his first group, which played music by The Mamas and the Papas and others. His father gave him a Lowrey organ for his 14th birthday, and he started a rock band with other neighborhood kids, playing music by The Doors. He also played contrabass in his school's orchestra. 

At age 17, Carey moved to New Hampshire to start a new band called Blessings with a singer he knew, and soon the band had a major recording contract with ABC Dunhill. After two years of working on the project, the band was unable to complete its first album. In a 2013 interview, Carey listed his own involvement with girls, the producer's drug use, and "too much bullshit" from Dunhill as the reasons the album was never completed.

Career

Rainbow
While Carey and his band Blessings were in S. I. R. Rehearsal Studios in Hollywood working on material for their unfinished album, guitarist Ritchie Blackmore of Deep Purple was in another room, with bassist Jimmy Bain, auditioning musicians for his new band Rainbow. Carey said Blackmore liked what he was hearing in the other room and asked Bain to invite Carey to audition. Out of frustration with his own band's inability to complete their first album, Carey accepted the invitation, and later accepted the position with Rainbow when it was offered. He recorded one studio album with Rainbow, the highly acclaimed Rising (1976, #48 on The Billboard 200). Carey's work on the album included the keyboard introduction to the opening track "Tarot Woman", and an extended keyboard solo on "A Light in the Black", the last cut on the album. During Carey's two world tours with Rainbow, live material was recorded and subsequently released as two double LPs, On Stage (1977, #65 on the Billboard 200) and Live in Germany (1990). In addition to the two double LPs, a six-disc CD box set containing music from the 1976 European leg, Deutschland Tournee 1976, was released in 2006. On the following album Long Live Rock 'n' Roll, released 1978, Carey would claim that nearly all the keyboard parts that he recorded, survived onto the final album.

1977–1983: Early solo years
Carey left Rainbow in 1977 and moved to Germany in 1978, where he began work on his solo career. This was a period in his life when, according to Carey himself, he had health problems due to drug use and spent many 20-hour days in a recording studio (which he co-owned) with his friend and recording engineer Nigel Jopson.

The studio's other co-owner, producer Peter Hauke, allowed Carey free use of the studio all night for several years, which gave him ample time and opportunity, and he subsequently recorded a great deal of instrumental music in many different styles, learning how to engineer as well as perform in the recording studio.

His first solo album to be released was In the Absence of the Cat, in 1982, on the indie label X-Records. Records recorded 1979-1982 were never originally approved for release by Carey.

Carey released I Won't Be Home Tonight, on the Rocshire label in 1982, along with the single (and music video) "West Coast Summer Nights". The album peaked at #167 on the Billboard 200, and the single peaked at #64 on the Billboard Hot 100 chart. The title track was also released as a single, peaking at #79 on the Hot 100 and #8 on Billboards Top Rock Tracks chart. Rocshire fell under hard times following the death of its promoter, Stacy Davis (who had appeared in the "West Coast Summer Nights" video), and was closed down a year later by federal agents following an investigation resulting in the imprisonment for embezzlement of the label's co-owners and seizure of the label's assets. The album rights and masters for I Won't Be Home Tonight were seized by federal authorities, and they remain the property of the US Internal Revenue Service. Carey found himself without a label.

1983–1985: Planet P Project, Geffen, and MCA
Following the release of I Won't Be Home Tonight, Carey was signed to Geffen Records for a new solo album (later to be released as Some Tough City), but he had a great deal of music written that didn't fit the style of that album. He was able to sign a second record deal with Geffen to record and release that additional material under the Planet P Project pseudonym, which he would use throughout his career for his more progressive and experimental music.

He released his first album under the name Planet P Project in March 1983, (originally titled Planet P), which peaked at #42 on the Billboard 200. On the week ending March 19, 1983, both Planet P Project and Carey's earlier album I Won't Be Home Tonight were climbing Billboard's Rock Albums chart simultaneously, with Planet P Project then at #30 and I Won't Be Home Tonight reaching its peak at #8. (The following week Planet P Project had made it up to #15, though I Won't Be Home Tonight had slipped to the #10 position).

Planet P Project received modest reviews (ref and), despite being listed for two weeks by Billboard as a Top Add. The album, however, contained the song "Why Me", which was released as Planet P Project's first single, reaching #64 on the Billboard Hot 100 singles chart and #4 in the magazine's Top Rock Tracks chart. According to Carey, the video for "Why Me" made a "slight impact on early MTV." A follow-up single was released from Planet P Project, "Static", which reached #24 on Billboards Top Rock Tracks.

Carey finished his recordings of his solo album, Some Tough City, and his second Planet P Project album, Pink World. A dispute with the label arose when Geffen's representative was not satisfied with the lyrics to "A Fine, Fine Day" and "The First Day of Summer". Additionally, the finished Pink World album was not at all well received by the label, and neither record was released by Geffen. Carey said, "Long story short, I got traded like a baseball player to MCA Records, which went ahead and released both of these records."

In March 1984, MCA released Some Tough City, with the single "A Fine, Fine Day" reaching #22 on the Billboard Hot 100 singles chart and also #1 on the Top Rock Tracks chart. A follow-up single, "The First Day of Summer", reached #33 on the Hot 100 in July 1984 and appeared in the 1985 film Secret Admirer. The album itself, Some Tough City, peaked at #60 on the Billboard 200 album chart. Carey opened for Night Ranger on many dates of their 1984 tour in support of this album.

Following that release, in late 1984, MCA released Planet P Project's Pink World as a double LP rock opera (#121 on the Billboard 200), for which Carey wrote the lyrics and music, sang all vocals, and played most of the instruments. The single "What I See" reached #25 on Billboards Top Rock Tracks. Both the double LP and the single were released on pink vinyl. A single music video for two songs on Pink World, "What I See" and "Behind the Barrier", remained in power rotation or active rotation for ten weeks on the MTV network.

Carey's 1985 follow-up solo album, Blue Highway, took a long time to record and did not score a hit on radio. Carey has stated that the album suffered problems unrelated to him but very related to 'the producer' Peter Hauke. Jennifer Rush covered Carey's "Live Wire", from Blue Highway, on her album "Movin'. Carey finally left MCA Records after the release of Blue Highway.

1986–1989: Music producer, composer, film soundtracks
Carey began producing and guesting on releases by other artists. 1986 Carey produced and co-wrote Now That You're Gone by Joe Cocker. It was the title song from the German movie Schimanski:  (German title: "Zabou"), starring Götz George.

Carey continued to record soundtracks. After his 1987 release Bedtime Story (soundtrack for the German film The Joker, Lethal Obsession, with Peter Maffay), Carey recorded a second soundtrack album, called Wilder Westen Inclusive, which featured the single "Room With A View" (#3 on the German Charts, 1989), which stayed 18 weeks on the German charts and received a Gold record. Wilder Westen Inclusive was a three-part television film directed by Dieter Wedel.

Carey played keyboards and did the production for the 1988 album Chicago Line by John Mayall & the Bluesbreakers. Carey also played on albums with various artists such as Peter Maffay, Milva and Anne Haigis.

In November 1989, Carey released the album For You, produced by Carey and Nigel Jopson. The album featured the single "I Feel Good" (#35 on the German Charts), which was also featured in the German television movie "Tatort: Katjas Schweigen (Katjas Silence)" starring Götz George.  A second single from For You was released, "No Man's Land", featuring Eric Burdon and Anne Haigis.

1990–1999: The nineties

In November 1990 Carey released the album Storyville, the last on Metronome records. It was produced by Carey and Sebastian Thorer and like the previous album it was recorded at Careys own built recording studio in Tutzing, Bavaria, Germany. "The Deal" and "Trampoline" were released as singles. Carey also produced, played several instruments and wrote four of the songs on Chris Normans album Interchange released on Polydor in 1991.

With a new record deal with the international East West, Carey released The Long Road in April 1992, produced by Erwin Musper. "Wonderland" and "Jail" were the singles from the album. 

In the autumn 1994 Carey released Cold War Kids
on East West, his last solo album with a major record label. It was an album that Carey produced together with guitarist Ken Rose and Ben Wisch. Five of the songs were co-written with Rose. The title track was the only single taken from the album. Carey said in 2019: "East West Records was now Universal like everyone else. They sent me to New York City to Quad Studios in Times Square. They paid $450,000 for an album I did called Cold War Kids. I had an ironclad promise that they’d release it world-wide so I could capitalise on the success I’d had in the ’80’s. It ended up being released in Norway, Switzerland and Germany and no English-speaking countries. When they wouldn’t release it or promote it, I walked into the record company with a cheque and told them that I was gone and at that point I left the music business in 1994." In 1994 Carey also spent a month in rehab. In 1995 he sang and co-wrote the single "Birds in Cages", which was featured in the soundtrack to the German TV movie The Ice Princess featuring Katarina Witt. Carey also produced, wrote music and played on three albums with swiss singer Natacha. 

A soundtrack followed in 1999, Gefangen im Jemen, accompanying Peter Patzaks TV Movie featuring Peter Maffay. It was released by BMG Germany. The Boystown Tapes was also released the same year on Happy Street Records, and featured songs recorded between 1990-98. Some of the songs were out-takes originally intended for other albums.

1999-2009: Mallorca years, Return of Planet P Project and cancer

Carey had at this time moved from Germany, and lived six years in Mallorca. He recorded the next album there, Island and Deserts, released in 2004.

Carey had also been writing and recording new material since the early nineties with a more political and historical theme. Some of the tracks, and a unauthorized version of a new album called Go Out Dancing, leaked to the internet.

Planet P Project returned on 24 December 2003 with Go Out Dancing Part 1 - 1931, first available as a free download. This was the first album of a trilogy of albums collectively called Go Out Dancing (G.O.D.). The other two albums were G.O.D. Part 2 - Levittown (released March 2008), and G.O.D. Part 3 - Out In The Rain (released December 2009). Carey would also release the compilation The New Machine, which featured some tracks recorded in the eighties that was the attempt at a third Planet P album that was never completed.

In 2006 Carey produced and played on Songs For the Siren by David Knopfler of Dire Straits. In a November 12, 2011 interview on LKCB 128.4 Internet Radio, Carey claimed, "I've written over a thousand songs, for myself. other artists, and film and TV productions."

In March 2009 Carey was diagnosed with a virulent form of bladder cancer. At one point he was told his odds of survival were ten percent. After twelve weeks in the hospital and five surgeries, he made a full recovery. "I tried to get my 'bucket list' finished as quickly as I could; it wasn't a certainty that I'd be around much longer," noted Carey. "I'm missing some of my organs; you'll be relieved to hear that the Hammond isn't one of them." Carey's former Rainbow bandmate Ronnie James Dio died of stomach cancer shortly after Carey's recovery. Carey said in a May 28, 2010 interview with Jason Saulnier, "I'm very sad about his passing, especially because we got essentially the same disease, and I beat it, and he didn't."

2009–2011: Over the Rainbow, EBC ROXX and cover albums
In 2009, Carey and three other ex-members of Rainbow, Joe Lynn Turner, Bobby Rondinelli and Greg Smith, teamed up with Jürgen Blackmore, Ritchie Blackmore's son, to form Over the Rainbow to perform Rainbow songs in concerts in Russia and Eastern Europe. Due to illness, however, Carey left Over the Rainbow in the spring of 2009, just before the band's live debut at the Sweden Rock Festival, where he was replaced by Paul Morris.

Carey released Christmas Hymns in December 2009, an homage to the hymns he sang as a boy at midnight mass.

In 2010 it was announced that Carey had formed a new musical racing project called EBC ROXX with (J.R.) Jürgen Blackmore and Ela. Their first single, "Silver Arrows", was released in March 2010 and was written as an anthem to accompany the first race of Mercedes Formula 1 pilots Michael Schumacher and Nico Rosberg that season. The project released a full CD entitled Winners later that year.

In March 2010 and in early 2011 Carey released two albums featuring cover versions Stanislaus County Kid Volume 1 and 2.

2013: Second return of Planet P Project
After officially dismantling "Planet P Project" in 2009 with the third and final part to the G.O.D. trilogy "Out In The Rain", Carey again revived the project with the release of "Steeltown" in 2013, this time merging his solo career name with the project's name ("Tony Carey's Planet P Project"). Contributors on this disc include guitarist Ronnie Le Tekro (TNT), Jimmy Durand on guitars and drums, Jostein 'sarge' Svarstad on guitars. Russian guitarist Valery Lunichkin contributed a solo on "On The Side Of The Angels" and Karsten Kreppert played drums on "The Lady Fair".

"Steeltown" was based on Norway and its history, after Carey played and travelled there extensively, both as a solo artist and with a band consisting of mostly Norwegian musicians. Influenced by the occupation years of World War II and the reaction of Norway as a nation to that, the work is also a statement about religious conflicts worldwide.

10 February 2014, a box set of the three Planet P Project Go Out Dancing CDs was released, The G.O.D.B.O.X., which included an earlier bootleg of promotional recordings for the project.

2015: Rainbow Project live shows

In 2015 he started to play live shows as TONY CAREY'S RAINBOW PROJECT: The Dio Years, with Norwegian singer Åge Sten Nilsen. Carey said: "Also Per Ole Iversen on drums, Jostein Svarstad on guitar and Jan Holberg on bass. All four of these guys are Norwegian, I met them in 2012 and we've been playing together ever since - fantastic musicians who can play anything I ask them to." In the setlist were Rainbow classics, and in 2018 three ex-members of the British rock band Rainbow performed with their projects on stage at Moscow’s Crocus City Hall. The rock veterans were the two keyboard players Don Airey, Carey and singer Doogie White.

2019-present: Lucky Us and The Return of The Stanislaus County Kid 
In April 2019 Carey released Lucky Us, a return to simpler people-based themes. "I wrote six political history lessons; I think I've said all I have to say about that for awhile...'Lucky Us' is also about winning the lottery of life."

Carey also recorded a 19-minute rock opera entitled "Operation: Paperclip, The Return of The Stanislaus County Kid", written by Bob Madsen and Kenny Steel. It was released in July 2019 on Highlander Company Records. The mini album was based on characters originally created by Carey from his first solo albums. Madsen wrote the lyrics and story line first, and they wrote the music soon after, and Carey sang on the songs and added some keyboards. Gregg Bissonette played drums. They also recorded a cover, “For What Its Worth” by Buffalo Springfield.

Carey returned with a new single release, "We Hear You Calling", on 19 February 2021, with a version of "Deportee" written by Woody Guthrie.

He also became a member of the band Mandoki Soulmates featuring Leslie Mandoki.
Carey lives in Wiesbaden, Germany, with his wife Marion, and Carey has three daughters.

Discography

Solo

1982  In the Absence of the Cat (demos)
1982  I Won't Be Home Tonight / Self titled
1984  Some Tough City
1985  Blue Highway
1987  Bedtime Story (soundtrack)
1988  Wilder Westen Inclusive (soundtrack)
1989  For You
1990  Storyville
1992  The Long Road
1994  Cold War Kids
1999  The Boystown Tapes
2004  Islands and Deserts
2009  Christmas Hymns
2010  Stanislaus County Kid
2011  Stanislaus County Kid, Volume II – Crossing the tracks
2019  Lucky Us

Planet P Project

1983  Planet P Project
1984  Pink World
2005  Go Out Dancing Part 1 "1931"
2008  Go Out Dancing Part 2 "Levittown"
2009  Go Out Dancing Part 3 "Out in The Rain"
2013  Steeltown
2014  The G.O.D.B.O.X. (4 disc set of G.O.D. part #1, 2 & 3 along with the remastered original bootleg of Go Out Dancing)

Operation: Paperclip
2019  The Return of Stanislaus County Kid (mini album with Bob Madsen and Kenny Steel; lead vocals and keyboards by Carey)

Instrumental albums

1982  Yellow Power
1982  Explorer (demos)
1982  Heaven (demos)
1982  No Human (demos)
1984  T.C.P. (2011 as Early Adventures in Analog)
1999  Gefangen im Jemen (soundtrack) (3 tracks sung by Carey: "World Without You", "Going Away" and "The Sun Got in my Eyes", and 17 instrumental tracks)
2006  The Voyager Files

Live albums

2006  Live in Sweden 2006 – Volume #1
2009  Live In Sweden 2006 – Volume #2
2011  Live in Europe

DVD

2008  A candlelight evening – Live in Sweden, 2006 
2016 "Showtime" 2 DVD set: Live Sweden rock 2015, solo show and concert with Zöller network

Single Releases only

1981  Jamie (single)
1988  Midnight wind (B track for Whitney Houston's "One moment in time" single, from the 1988 summer Olympic album)
1991  Wenn die Liebe geht – That's not love to me (with Ina Morgan)
1994  Route 66 (Rose T.C.)
1995  Birds in cages
2004  Überall du (German version of "Room with a view" featuring Mo Casal)
2021 We Hear You Calling

Compilations

1989  The Story So Far (1984-1987)
1993  For You (1988-1990)
1993  Rare Tracks (1979-1981) (not approved by Carey)
1997  A Fine, Fine Day (1984-1985)
1997  Storyville (1989-1990)
2000  Retrospective 1982–1999
2006  The Chillout Tapes (featuring DJ Shah) (limited edition release)
2006  Just Ballads
2008  Roundup – The Ones That Got Away 
2008  A Lonely Life – The Anthology (1982-1999)
2008  Only The Young Die Good (songs from The Boystown Tapes and Island and Deserts)
2009  The New Machine (tracks originally recorded 1985-1994)
2010  Rewind (limited free download – Slightly different versions of songs taken from Planet P Project – G.O.D. II & III and Stanislaus County Kid)
2011  Just Ballads, Volume II 
2012  Just Rock (1984-2008) 
2014  Songs about people (1988-2004)

Other appearances 
Selected other recordings:

1976  Rising – Studio recording with the band Rainbow (keyboards)
1976  On stage – Live with the band Rainbow (keyboards)
1977  Putting it straight – Studio recording with Pat Travers (mini Moog on "Off Beat Ride')
1978  Live at the Hollywood Palladium – Live recording with The Force (keyboards & vocals)
1981  Working – Studio recording with Omega (guitar, lyrics)
1983  Wynn over America – Studio recording with Michael Wynn (bass, guitar, keyboards, producer, songwriter)
1985  Sonne in der Nacht – Studio recording with Peter Maffay (guitar, keyboards, producer, songwriter, backing vocals)
1985  Movin – Studio recording Jennifer Rush (songwriter, "Live Wire")
1985  The circle – Studio recording with Max Carl (backing vocals)
1986  Now that you're gone – Studio recording of Joe Cocker (producer, songwriter)
1986  Tabaluga und das leuchtende Schweigen – Studio recording with Peter Maffay (guitar, keyboards, producer, songwriter, backing vocals)
1988  Lange Schatten – Studio recording with Peter Maffay (guitar, keyboards, producer, songwriter, backing vocals)
1988  Chicago line – Studio recording with Johnny Mayall's Blues Breakers (keyboards, piano, producer)
1988  Unterwegs Nach Morgen – Studio recording with Milva (producer, songwriter)
1990  Live in Germany, 76''' – Live with the band Rainbow (keyboards)
1991  Interchange – Studio recording with Chris Norman (songwriter, producer, bass, acoustic guitar, keyboards and backing vocals)
1991  Alles easy – Studio Recording with Ina Morgan (producer, vocals, all instruments)
1993  Orlando –  Studio recording with Natacha (producer, bass, acoustic guitar, keyboards)
1993  Respect – Studio recording of the band Sinner (producer, keyboards, vocals on "Billy's Song" and "All For One")
1995  Stärntaler – Studio recording with Natacha (producer, bass, acoustic guitar, keyboards, songwriter)
1996  Venezia – Studio recording with Natacha (producer, bass, acoustic guitar, keyboards, songwriter)
2002 Tabaluga Viatja Buscant El Seny – José Carreras and Cris Juanico (producer)
2003  Second Step – Summer tour Live 2003 – Live recording with Melvin Taylor & The Slack Band (Hammond, keyboard, vocals)
2006  Songs for the Siren – Studio recording with David Knopfler (Hammond, piano, producer)
2006  Deutschland Tournee, 1976 (30th anniversary ed. box set) – Live with the band Rainbow (keyboards)
2009  Fade to black – Studio recording with the band Evil Masquerade (keyboards on "Lights Out")
2010  The Pirates from Hell – Studio recording with the band Zed Yago (keyboards)
2010  The Winners – Studio recording project called EBC Roxx (with J.R. Jürgen Blackmore & Ela)
2013  The Jan Holberg Project : At Your Service (lead vocals on the tracks "Outta My Face" and "21 Red")
2017  The Well'' - Studio recording with Trine Rein, (vocals, instruments and producing)

References

External links
Tony Carey's website

1953 births
Living people
American rock keyboardists
American heavy metal keyboardists
Rainbow (rock band) members
American session musicians
American expatriates in Germany
People from Turlock, California
People from Watsonville, California
21st-century American keyboardists
20th-century American keyboardists